Mill Creek is a town in Johnston County, Oklahoma, United States. The population was 319 at the 2010 census, a decline from the figure of 340 in 2000.  Mill Creek Community is an unincorporated area of Johnston County that surrounds the town and claims to have about 1,000 residents, including those who live within the town limits. Local residents consider the town as the focal point of the community.

History
In 1852, when the post office was first established, the town was named Mineral Hill and was within the Choctaw Nation, Indian Territory. The 1855 Treaty of Separation between the Choctaws and Chickasaws established the latter as a separate nation, effective March 4, 1856. Mill Creek then fell within the Chickasaw Nation boundaries.  The post office was renamed Harris Mill in 1859, after Chickasaw Governor Cyrus Harris built a large grist mill on the local creek. The name changed back to Mill Creek in 1879. In 1902, the town of Mill Creek incorporated in Indian Territory, and after statehood, became Mill Creek, Oklahoma, on November 16, 1907.

The town's history is closely linked to the railroad. The St. Louis, Oklahoma, and Southern Railway laid tracks through the Mill Creek area from 1900 to 1901. Soon, the town became one of the largest shipping points for cattle in the region.

The population peaked in 1907, at 644.

Geography

Demographics

As of the census of 2000, there were 340 people, 125 households, and 93 families residing in the town. There were 147 housing units at an average density of 387.5 per square mile (149.4/km2). The racial makeup of the town was 59.12% White, 30.00% Native American, 1.47% Asian, 0.29% from other races, and 9.12% from two or more races. Hispanic or Latino of any race were 0.88% of the population.

There were 125 households, out of which 36.8% had children under the age of 18 living with them, 58.4% were married couples living together, 13.6% had a female householder with no husband present, and 25.6% were non-families. 24.0% of all households were made up of individuals, and 12.8% had someone living alone who was 65 years of age or older. The average household size was 2.72 and the average family size was 3.23.

In the town, the population was spread out, with 30.0% under the age of 18, 7.1% from 18 to 24, 28.8% from 25 to 44, 20.3% from 45 to 64, and 13.8% who were 65 years of age or older. The median age was 36 years. For every 100 females, there were 91.0 males. For every 100 females age 18 and over, there were 84.5 males.

The median income for a household in the town was $24,479, and the median income for a family was $26,250. Males had a median income of $29,500 versus $16,250 for females. The per capita income for the town was $10,661. About 23.4% of families and 28.7% of the population were below the poverty line, including 43.0% of those under age 18 and 20.5% of those age 65 or over.

Economy
According to the Encyclopedia of Oklahoma History and Culture, the main economic activity now is extraction of gravel and granite. The granite is noted for its pink color and is marketed under the trade name "Autumn Rose."

Notable person
Cyrus Harris (1817-1888), was a native of Mississippi but moved to Mill Creek in 1855. He became the first governor of the Chickasaw Nation and was re-elected to the position four more times. He made his home near the present town of Mill Creek and was buried in Old Mill Creek Cemetery.

Notes

References

Towns in Johnston County, Oklahoma
Towns in Oklahoma
Populated places established in 1852